Byssonectria is a genus of fungi in the family Pyronemataceae.

Species
Byssonectria aggregata
Byssonectria balansae
Byssonectria buchsii
Byssonectria cartilaginea
Byssonectria chrysocoma
Byssonectria cupulata
Byssonectria delicatula
Byssonectria dichotoma
Byssonectria fimeti
Byssonectria fusispora
Byssonectria globifila
Byssonectria miliaria
Byssonectria obducens
Byssonectria rosella
Byssonectria seaveri
Byssonectria tetraspora
Byssonectria thuemenii

References

Pyronemataceae
Pezizales genera